Type 6 may refer to:
 Peugeot Type 6, an automobile by the manufacturer Peugeot
 Japanese Type 6 submarine
 Spinocerebellar ataxia type 6, a rare, late-onset, autosomal dominant disorder
 Bristol Type 6 T.T.A, a British two-seat, twin-engine biplane
 Type 6 fire engine
 Bugatti Type 6, a prototype automobile designed by Ettore Bugatti
 Mucopolysaccharidosis type 6, a form of mucopolysaccharidosis
 C-C chemokine receptor type 6, a CC chemokine receptor